Semmipalayam is a census town in Tirupur district in the Indian state of Tamil Nadu.

Demographics
 India census, Semmipalayam had a population of 6188. Males constitute 53% of the population and females 47%. Semmipalayam has an average literacy rate of 69%, higher than the national average of 59.5%: male literacy is 77%, and female literacy is 60%. In Semmipalayam, 10% of the population is under 6 years of age.

References

Cities and towns in Tiruppur district